The Moscow–Kazan high-speed railway is a planned 772-kilometre long high-speed railway line connecting the cities of Moscow and Kazan in the Russian Federation, going through the intermediate cities of Vladimir, Nizhny Novgorod and Cheboksary. The project has an expected completion date of 2023, and is slated to be the first segment of an ambitious transnational high-speed railway set to connect Beijing and Moscow over a distance in excess of 7,000 kilometres, which is currently under consideration by the governments of Russia and China. Planning work was finished in September 2017. Preliminary construction on stations and platforms, with space reserved for the railway, started in spring 2018. Construction on the railway has been postponed as of March 2020, due to the high cost (estimated at 1.7 trillion rubles) and in lieu of further studies on ridership.

Details

Route: Moscow – Vladimir – Nizhny Novgorod – Kazan (- Vladivostok/Beijing)
Route length: 762 km
Track gauge:  Russian gauge
Number of tracks: 2 Russian gauge tracks
Electrification: 25 kV 50 Hz AC overhead lines (with 3 kV DC overhead lines inside of the Greater Ring of the Moscow Railway)
Loading gauge: Russian T loading gauge
Platform heights:  and 
 Future travel time Moscow – Kazan: 3 hours 17 minutes.
 Avg speed: 235 km/h

Rolling stocks
Proposed rolling stocks for this line which include:
Talgo AVRIL Russian-gauge version
Sapsan trainsets, which need to be modified including retractable steps for low platforms and main transformers for AC overhead lines
Shinkansen-based trainsets, with Russian gauge and low doors

See also
 High-speed rail in Russia

References

High-speed rail in Russia
2023 in rail transport